Ardit Osmani (born 3 May 1996) is an Albanian football player. He plays as a defender for Shkumbini Peqin football club in the Albanian First Division.

References

External links
 Profile - FSHF

1996 births
Living people
Footballers from Kavajë
Albanian footballers
Association football defenders
Besa Kavajë players
KF Korabi Peshkopi players
KF Erzeni players
KF Shkumbini players
Kategoria e Parë players